The Hamamatsu International Piano Competition has been held every 3 years since 1991 in Hamamatsu, Shizuoka, Japan, and is open to pianists up to 30 years old.

History
The Piano Competition was inaugurated in 1991 to commemorate the 80th anniversary of the founding of Hamamatsu City on July 1, 1911.
The Competition has been a member of the World Federation of International Music Competitions since 1998.

Top prize winners
The 1st prize winners are:

 1991 – Sergei Babayan
 1994 – Victor Liadov
 1997 – Alessio Bax
 2000 – Alexander Gavrylyuk
 2003 – Rafal Blechacz and Alexander Kobrin (tied)
 2006 – Alexej Gorlatch, Ukraine
 2009 – Seong-Jin Cho, South Korea
 2012 – Ilya Rashkovsky, Russia
 2015 – Alexander Gadjiev, Italy/Slovenia
 2018 – Can Çakmur, Turkey

References

External links
 

Music competitions in Japan
Piano competitions
Hamamatsu